Molotof is a Portuguese dessert based on egg whites and caramel.

Origin
There are various theories about the origin of its name. One of them states its original name was Malakoff pudding and is related to the 1853-1856 Crimean War. Malakoff was a fortress protecting the city of Sevastopol. French general Pélissier took this fortress and received the title of Duke of Malakof. It is a wartime dessert.

During the 1939-45 war, he appointed Vyacheslav Mikalovich Skriabine as Minister of Foreign Affairs of the USSR, whom they called Molotov in hiding. It was with this name that it became known internationally. It is likely that due to confusion with this name, the Portuguese people started calling this dessert Pudim Molotov.

References

Portuguese cuisine
Portuguese desserts
Meringue desserts